Pablo Antonio Pallante Mieres (born 14 February 1979 in Montevideo) is a retired Uruguayan footballer.

He went on loan to Grosseto on 16 August 2007 for the 2007–08 season and Gallipoli for the 2009–10 season.

External links
 Profile at tenfieldigital.com.uy
 Gazzetta.it

1979 births
Living people
Uruguayan footballers
Uruguayan expatriate footballers
Association football wingers
Footballers from Montevideo
Montevideo Wanderers F.C. players
Club Atlético River Plate (Montevideo) players
Plaza Colonia players
C.A. Cerro players
Miramar Misiones players
F.C. Grosseto S.S.D. players
A.S.D. Gallipoli Football 1909 players
Villa Española players
Serie B players
Cobresal footballers
Uruguayan expatriate sportspeople in Chile
Uruguayan expatriate sportspeople in Italy
Expatriate footballers in Chile
Expatriate footballers in Italy